Evandro Silva do Nascimento, known as Evandro Paulista (born 26 September 1987), is a Brazilian footballer who play as a forward. Who currently plays for Thai League 2 side Nakhon Si United.

Club career

FC Seoul 
On 4 January 2018, Evandro joined the K League 1 side FC Seoul.

On 19 February 2019, Officially Evandro's contract with FC Seoul was terminated by mutual consent.

References

External links

Profile at FC Gifu
 2007–08 Profile at Portuguesde Liga

1987 births
Living people
Footballers from São Paulo (state)
People from Guarulhos
Brazilian footballers
Association football forwards
Brazilian expatriate footballers
Sociedade Esportiva do Gama players
União São João Esporte Clube players
C.F. Os Belenenses players
Primeira Liga players
J2 League players
K League 1 players
China League One players
Oita Trinita players
FC Gifu players
Daegu FC players
FC Seoul players
Sichuan Longfor F.C. players
Expatriate footballers in Portugal
Expatriate footballers in Japan
Brazilian expatriate sportspeople in Japan
Brazilian expatriate sportspeople in Portugal
Expatriate footballers in South Korea
Brazilian expatriate sportspeople in South Korea
Expatriate footballers in China
Brazilian expatriate sportspeople in China